Andohajango is a town or commune in Madagascar. It is in the district of Mandritsara, which is a part of Sofia Region. The population of the commune was estimated at approximately 13,000 in the 2001 commune census.

There is a primary and junior level secondary school in the town. The vast majority (99%) of the population of the town are farmers. The most important crop is rice, while other important products are peanut, maize, cassava and raffia palm. Services provide employment for the remaining 1% of the population.

References and notes 

Populated places in Sofia Region